Stephen Strimpell (January 17, 1934 - April 10, 2006) was the star of the Universal Television series Mister Terrific.

Personal life
Strimpell was born on January 17, 1934. He was a junior Phi Beta Kappa at Columbia College, a graduate of Columbia Law School, and a member of the New York Bar before embarking in earnest on his acting career. Well known for many years as a popular New York acting teacher at HB Studio and in his private classes, Strimpell was also an accomplished actor, having played the title role in The Disintegration of James Cherry at Lincoln Center and appearing in such off Broadway plays as To Be Young Gifted and Black and The Exhaustion of Our Son’s Love. 
At the American Shakespeare Festival he appeared in plays with Katharine Hepburn, among others, including Antony and Cleopatra, All's Well That Ends Well, Romeo and Juliet, Twelfth Night, The Merry Wives of Windsor, and A Midsummer Night’s Dream. He also had featured parts in over a dozen films, including Fitzwilly, Death Play, Jenny, The Angel Levine, Act One, and Hester Street. He directed at the Mark Taper Forum in Los Angeles, and appeared there in Douglas Campbell's 1968 production of The Miser with Hume Cronyn and Jessica Tandy.

Film acting
When Stephen Strimpell moved to Los Angeles, his most famous film role may have been in the 1967 CBS comedy series owned by Universal Television, Mister Terrific, filmed in Universal City at Universal Studios, in which he played Stanley Beamish, an innocent gas station attendant, who morphed into the title character, a superhero with an ability to fly. Although the series lasted only one season, it had a second life as a cult favorite. Strimpell's personal account of his experiences doing Mr. Terrific appears in a long article, "The amazing Mr. Terrific: How TV actor Stephen Strimpell Survived the ‘Flying Harness’ and Other Inane Hollywood Inventions".

Death
On March 13, 2006, Stephen Strimpell suffered heart failure and cardiac arrest. He died on April 10, 2006.

Filmography

References

1934 births
2006 deaths
Male actors from New York City
American male film actors
20th-century American lawyers
American male stage actors
Columbia Law School alumni
20th-century American male actors
Columbia College (New York) alumni